Apotoforma cydna is a species of moth of the family Tortricidae. It is found in Venezuela.

The wingspan is about 15 mm. The ground colour of the forewings is pale brownish grey with an ash-grey hue and some fine brown-grey transverse strigulae along the costa and two reddish dots in the postbasal area. The costa is spotted grey with a row of black scales. The hindwings are greyish brown.

References

Moths described in 1993
Tortricini
Moths of South America